Miss World 1971, the 21st edition of the Miss World pageant, was held on 10 November 1971 at the Royal Albert Hall in London, UK. 56 contestants competed for the Miss World and Lúcia Petterle from Brazil won the crown of Miss World 1971. She was crowned by Miss World 1970, Jennifer Hosten of Grenada. Although Petterle completed her reign as Miss World, she fell and broke her arm in the final month of her year and was unable to travel to London to participate in the Miss World 1972 contest.

Results

Placements

Special awards

Contestants

  – Gaily Ryan
  – Alicia Beatriz Daneri
  – Maria Elizabeth Bruin
  – Valerie Roberts
  – Waltraud Lucas
  – Frances Clarkson
  – Martine De Hert
  – Rene Furbert
  – Lúcia Petterle 
  – Lana Drouillard
  – Gail Abayasinghe
  – Kyriaki Koursoumba
  – Haydée Kuret
  – María Cecilia Gómez
  – Mirja Halme
  – Myriam Stocco
  – Irene Neumann
  – Lisette Chipolina
  – Maria Maltezou
  – Deborah Bordallo Nelson
  – Nalini Moonsar
  – Monica Strotmann
  – Fanney Bjarnadóttir
  – Prema Narayan
  – June Glover
  – Miri Ben-David
  – Maria Pinnone
  – Ava Joy Gill
  – Emiko Ikeda
  – Lee Young-eun
  – Mariette Werckx
  – Daphne Munro
  – Doris Abdilla
  – Marie-Anne Ng Sik Kwong
  – Lucía Arellano
  – Linda Ritchie
  – Soraya Herrera
  – Kate Starvik
  – María de Lourdes Rivera
  – Rosa María Duarte
  – Onelia Ison Jose
  – Ana Paula de Almeida
  – Raquel Quintana
  – Nadia Morel du Boil
  – Monica Fairall
  – María García
  – Simonetta Kohl
  – Patrice Sollner
  – Boonyong Thongboon
  – Maria Jordan
  – Souad Keneari
  – Nil Menemencioglu
  – Marilyn Ann Ward
  – Brucene Smith
  – Ana María Padrón Ibarrondo
  – Zlata Petković †

Notes

Debuts

Returns

Last competed in 1966:
 
 
Last competed in 1967:
 
Last competed in 1969:

Crossovers

Miss Universe
 1968:  – Monica Fairall
 1969:  – Patrice Sollner (Semi-finalist)
 1970:  – Irene Neumann
 1971:  – Martine De Hert
 1971:  – Rene Furbert
 1971:  – Lana Drouillard
 1971:  – Myriam Stocco (Semi-finalist)
 1971:  – Linda Ritchie
 1971:  – Marilyn Ann Ward (Semi-finalist, as )
 1972:  – Doris Abdilla
Miss International
 1970:  – María García
 1971:  – Doris Abdilla
 1972:  – Monica Strotmann
 1974:  – Brucene Smith (Winner)

Miss Young International
 1970:  – Zlata Petković (Miss Photogenic)
Reinado Internacional del Café
 1973:  – Alicia Beatriz Daneri (Winner)
Maja Internacional
 1969:  – Patrice Sollner (2nd runner-up)
Miss Europe
 1971:  – Martine De Hert
 1971:  – Myriam Stocco (3rd runner-up)
 1971:  – Mariette Werckx
 1971:  – Ana Paula de Almeida
Un Volto Per Il Cinema (Miss Cinema Europa)
 1971:  – María García
 1972:  – Waltraud Lucas (2nd runner-up)
Queen of the Pacific
 1972:  – Prema Narayan (1st runner-up)

Other notes
 9 of the contestants share the name Maria. They are: Miss Aruba (Maria Elizabeth Bruin), Miss Ecuador (María Cecilia Gómez), Miss Greece (Maria Maltezou), Miss Italy (Maria Pinnone), Miss Panama (María de Lourdes Rivera), Miss Paraguay (Rosa María Duarte), Miss Spain (María García), Miss Trinidad & Tobago (Maria Jordan), and Miss Venezuela (Ana María Padrón).

References

External links
 Pageantopolis – Miss World 1971

Miss World
1971 in London
1971 beauty pageants
Beauty pageants in the United Kingdom
Events at the Royal Albert Hall
November 1971 events in the United Kingdom